Jeanne Marie Spicuzza is an American actress, director and writer. She is best known for her work on the films Night Rain, The Scarapist, Field Day and more.

Life and career
Jeanne was born in Milwaukee, Wisconsin to educators Robert and Marianne. She earned Bachelor of Arts degree in philosophy and psychology from the University of Wisconsin–Milwaukee and Master of philosophy and herbalism. Her first screenplay Breath of God was a semifinalist in the Academy of Motion Picture Arts and Sciences Nicholl Fellowships in Screenwriting. Her short film Field Day, which screened at Portobello Film Festival. In 2005, she has written beautiful terrible & true.

In 2015 her directorial debut feature film, The Scarapist won  best picture at the Verein Deutscher Kritiker Und Filmemacher (VDKUF).

Filmography

Publications
 For Beautiful Children Like You
 My Italia
 beautiful terrible & true

References

External links 
 

Living people
American women film directors
American film actresses
American women screenwriters
1969 births
21st-century American women